TSV Eching is a German association football club from the municipality of Eching, located north of Munich, Bavaria. Established in 1947 as a football team, TSV today includes a winter sports department.



History
The football team spent their first three decades in Kreisliga and Bezirksliga play before winning promotion to the Landesliga Bayern-Süd (V) in 1981. Two seasons later the team again advanced, this time to the Oberliga Bayern (IV) for just a single season. TSV made another single season Oberliga appearance in 1985 before returning once again and this time staying up until 1993.

After being relegated, the club remained part of the Landesliga Bayern-Süd for the next 12 seasons before slipping to the Bezirksoberliga Oberbayern (VI) in 2005 and the Bezirksliga Oberbayern-Nord (VII) in 2007. They rebounded in the following seasons to make a return to the Landesliga (VI) in 2009–10, but finished 17th. In 2011, the team played in the Landesliga Bayern-Süd, after taking out a championship in the Bezirksoberliga Oberbayern (VII) in 2010–11. At the end of the 2011–12 season the club qualified for the promotion round to the newly expanded Bayernliga. A first round loss to SV Pullach however meant the club would remain in the Landesliga instead.

Honours
The club's honours:
 Landesliga Bayern-Süd
 Champions: 1983, 1990
 Runners-up: 1985, 1995
 Bezirksoberliga Oberbayern
 Champions: 2011
 Runners-up: 2009
 Bezirksliga Oberbayern-Nord
 Champions: 1980, 1981, 1988, 2008

Recent seasons
The recent season-by-season performance of the club:

With the introduction of the Bezirksoberligas in 1988 as the new fifth tier, below the Landesligas, all leagues below dropped one tier. With the introduction of the Regionalligas in 1994 and the 3. Liga in 2008 as the new third tier, below the 2. Bundesliga, all leagues below dropped one tier. With the establishment of the Regionalliga Bayern as the new fourth tier in Bavaria in 2012 the Bayernliga was split into a northern and a southern division, the number of Landesligas expanded from three to five and the Bezirksoberligas abolished. All leagues from the Bezirksligas onwards were elevated one tier.

References

External links
Official team site
Das deutsche Fußball-Archiv historical German domestic league tables 
fussballdaten.de historical German domestic league tables 

Football clubs in Germany
Football clubs in Bavaria
Association football clubs established in 1947
1947 establishments in Germany
Football in Upper Bavaria
Freising (district)